Gabriela Berríos Pagán (born November 30, 1990) is a Puerto Rican former model and beauty pageant titleholder. She represented Toa Baja municipality at Miss Universe Puerto Rico 2014 and represented Puerto Rico at Miss Universe 2014  held in Doral, Florida. She also  represented Puerto Rico at Miss International 2016.

Early life
Berríos was born on November 30, 1990, in San Juan, Puerto Rico. She was raised in Carolina and moved to Florida after her parents divorced. She initially studied business administration at Kaplan University but as of 2020 studies healthcare administration at University of Central Florida.

Berríos and her older sister Julianna started Sweets by Sisters, Inc., a bakery specializing in extravagantly-decorated cakes, in 2019, but it wasn't until the initial COVID-19 stay-at-home orders that they were able to turn their focus to growing their business. She confirmed in 2020 in an interview with Epiko Magazine that she had retired from pageantry.

Pageantry

Miss Universe 2014
Berríos represented Puerto Rico at Miss Universe 2014 where she competed to succeed the current titleholder, Gabriela Isler of Venezuela. Although considered to be a strong candidate by many, she failed to place in the Top 15. She did however win the award for Miss Photogenic and fainted during a commercial break before Paulina Vega of Colombia was crowned Miss Universe.

Miss International 2016
Berríos was chosen to represent Puerto Rico at Miss International 2016 where Edymar Martínez from Venezuela crowned her successor Kylie Vervosa of the Philippines at the end of the event. She did not reach the top 15 in the pageant.

References

External links
 Miss Universe Puerto Rico Official Website

Living people
Puerto Rican beauty pageant winners
Miss Universe 2014 contestants
1990 births
Miss International 2016 delegates
People from San Juan, Puerto Rico